Bozdağı is a neighborhood of Fatsa district in Ordu Province, Turkey.

Geography 
It is 64 km from Ordu and 12 km from Fatsa.

History 
The settlers who adopted the Ottoman way of life after the Ottoman Russian War settled in this region, since it is a clean and wet place. Georgian families with the surname Şavişuli, Elimoğlu, Gogitidze, Suknişşuli, Cincaroğlu, Ustalioğlu, Salikvaze, Vasaze, Lamaze, Çavuşoğlu are living in the neighborhood.

Population

References 

Villages in Ordu Province
Neighbourhoods in Turkey